Agnese Maffeis (born 9 March 1965, in Bergamo) is an Italian discus thrower and shot putter. She won six medals, at senior level, at the International athletics competitions.

She has 73 caps in national team from 1981 to 2003, second Italian athlete of all-time behind Marisa Masullo that have 79 caps.

Biography
She finished twelfth at the 1989 World Indoor Championships and eighth at the 1997 World Championships. She also competed in the 1996 Olympics, but failed to qualify from her pool. At the Mediterranean Games she won gold medals in shot put in 1987 and 1993 and in discus in 1991 and 1993. She won a silver medal in shot put in 1991 and in discus in 2001.

Her personal best throw currently stands at 63.66 metres, achieved in June 1996 in Milan. She is married to Alessandro Andrei.

Achievements

National titles
Agnese Maffeis has won 38 times the individual national championship (Italian all-time record-woman).
5 wins in the shot put (1989, 1990, 1991, 1992, 1993)
14 wins in the discus throw (1989, 1990, 1991, 1992, 1993, 1995, 1996, 1997, 1998, 2000, 2001, 2002, 2003, 2004)
9 wins in the shot put indoor (1986, 1987, 1988, 1989, 1990, 1991, 1992, 1993, 1994)
10 wins in the discus throw at the Italian Winter Throwing Championships (1986, 1992, 1994, 1996, 1998, 1999, 2001, 2002, 2003, 2004)

See also
 Italian Athletics Championships - Multi winners
 Italy national athletics team - Women's more caps
 Italian all-time lists - Shot put
 Italian all-time lists - Discus throw

References

External links
 

1965 births
Living people
Italian female discus throwers
Italian female shot putters
Athletes (track and field) at the 1992 Summer Olympics
Athletes (track and field) at the 1996 Summer Olympics
Olympic athletes of Italy
Sportspeople from Bergamo
Mediterranean Games gold medalists for Italy
Mediterranean Games silver medalists for Italy
Athletes (track and field) at the 1987 Mediterranean Games
Athletes (track and field) at the 1991 Mediterranean Games
Athletes (track and field) at the 1993 Mediterranean Games
Athletes (track and field) at the 2001 Mediterranean Games
World Athletics Championships athletes for Italy
Mediterranean Games medalists in athletics
Italian Athletics Championships winners